"Hawa Hawa" is a 1987 Urdu song sung by Pakistani pop singer Hasan Jahangir.

Composition
"Hawa Hawa" was recorded in 1986, and released in 1987. The tune of the song is based on the 1970s Persian song "Havar Havar" by Kourosh Yaghmaei. The song start with the line "Hawa Hawa Ai Hawa Khushbu Loota De" ("Air, oh Air, Swell the fragrance").

According to Jahangir the beats of the song "are extremely catchy and would appeal to people from diverse cultures and musical traditions. Even when you can't understand the language, you can appreciate the beats and the rhythm".

Reception
The song became immensely popular throughout South Asia, particularly in three countries Pakistan, India, and Bangladesh. Jahangir's album by the same name also became in India, and the song frequently played on radio in the country. The song was frequently remade in Bollywood films; sometimes with same lyrics and music and sometime with same music, but with different lyrics.

Shortly after the release of "Hawa Hawa", the tune of the song was unofficially used in "Jawan Jawan Ishq Jawan", a song from 1989 Govinda-starrer Billoo Badshah. It was sung by Govinda himself. The song "Aaya Aaya Pyar Aaya" in the 1989 Hindi film Aag Ka Gola was adapted from "Hawa Hawa". It was composed by Bappi Lahiri, and it featured Archana Puran Singh, Sunny Deol, and Prem Chopra dancing on the song.

In 2017, The makers of the Hindi film Mubarakan (2017) released a new version of this song as promotional single of their film, which was written with different lyrics while keeping "Hawa Hawa" hookline same. The version was sung by Mika Singh, featuring Arjun Kapoor and Ileana D'Cruz dancing on the song. Devarsi Ghosh, writing for Scroll.in, called the remake version 'earworm' which 'doesn't need a remake'. The remake version of the song also featured in the 2012 Hindi film Chaalis Chauraasi. The Bengali of "Hawa Hawa" also appeared in Bangladeshi song "O Tunir Ma".

References

Pakistani songs
Pakistani pop songs
Urdu-language songs
1987 songs